Seven ships of the Royal Navy have borne the name HMS Amphitrite, or HMS Amfitrite, after Amphitrite, a sea goddess of Greek mythology:

  was a 24-gun sixth rate launched in 1778 and wrecked in 1794.
She was renamed Amphitrite in 1795 and was broken up in 1811.
  was a 40-gun fifth rate captured from the Dutch in 1799.  She was renamed Imperieuse in 1801 and was broken up in 1805.
She was renamed Blanche in 1805 and was wrecked in 1807.
  was a fifth rate launched in 1816.  She was lent to contractors in 1862 and was broken up in 1875.
  was a  armoured cruiser launched in 1898.  She was converted into a minelayer in 1917 and was sold in 1920.

See also
 HM hired armed ship , which served the Royal Navy between 1793 and 1794.
 

Royal Navy ship names